Nasi goreng is a Southeast Asian fried rice dish, usually cooked with pieces of meat and vegetables. One of Indonesia's national dishes, it is also eaten in Malay-speaking communities in countries such as Malaysia, Singapore and Brunei, and has gained popularity in Sri Lanka through migrations from the Malay Archipelago, in countries like Suriname via Indonesian immigrant communities, and in the Netherlands through its colonial ties with Indonesia. Nasi goreng is distinguished from other Asian fried rice preparations by its distinct smoky aroma, and caramelised yet savoury undertones of flavour. There is no single defined recipe for nasi goreng, and its composition and preparation varies greatly from household to household.

Nasi goreng has long been considered an important staple of Indonesian cuisine. In 2018, it is officially recognized by the Indonesian government as one of the country's five national dishes. A ubiquitous meal throughout Indonesia, particularly for breakfast, it can be enjoyed in simple versions from a tin plate at a roadside food stall, eaten on porcelain in restaurants, or collected from the buffet tables at dinner parties in urban cities like Jakarta. Premixed packaged seasonings for nasi goreng are widely available for purchase, and microwave-heated frozen versions of nasi goreng may be found in convenience store outlets throughout Indonesia.

Etymology 
The term nasi goreng means "fried rice" in both the Indonesian and Malay languages. The Cambridge English Dictionary defines nasi goreng as an "Indonesian rice dish with pieces of meat and vegetables added", although this dish is just as common in neighbouring Malaysia and Singapore as a cultural staple.

History

Indonesia

Similar to other fried rice recipes in Asia, some commentators have suggested that Indonesian-style nasi goreng can trace its origin from Southern Chinese fried rice, and was likely developed as a way to avoid wasting rice. The Chinese influences upon Indonesian cuisine can be seen in mie goreng that appeared simultaneously with the introduction of the stir frying technique that required the use of a Chinese wok. In China, the stir frying technique became increasingly popular during the Ming dynasty (1368–1644 CE). The common soy sauce has its origin in 2nd century CE China, however, kecap manis (sweet soy sauce) was developed in Indonesia with a generous addition of local palm sugar.

However, it is unclear when the people of present-day Indonesia began to adopt the practice of cooking fried rice. The trade between China and the Indonesian archipelago flourished from the era of Srivijaya around the 10th century and intensified in the Majapahit era around the 15th century. By that time Chinese immigrants had begun to settle in the archipelago, bringing along with them their culture and cuisine. Chinese people usually favor freshly cooked hot food, and it is taboo to throw away uneaten foodstuffs in their culture. As a result, the previous day's leftover rice was often recooked in the morning. Gregory Rodgers suggested that frying the rice could prevent the propagation of dangerous microbes, especially in pre-refrigeration technology in Indonesia, and also avoid the need to throw out precious food.

Writer Fadly Rahman from Padjajaran University claimed that there is no historical evidence that proves that nasi goreng is native to Indonesia, and suggested another theory besides Chinese influence: that nasi goreng was actually inspired by a Middle Eastern dish called pilaf, which is rice cooked in seasoned broth. A particular variant, Betawi-style nasi goreng kambing (goat fried rice), uses mutton or goat meat (traditionally favoured by Arab Indonesians), rich spices and minyak samin (ghee), all typical ingredients used in the preparation of Middle-eastern pilaf.

Nasi goreng was considered as part of the Indies culture during the colonial period. The mention of nasi goreng appears in colonial literature of Dutch East Indies, such as in the Student Hidjo by Marco Kartodikoromo, a serial story published in Sinar Hindia newspaper in 1918. It was mentioned in a 1925 Dutch cookbook Groot Nieuw Volledig Oost Indisch Kookboek. Trade between the Netherlands and the Dutch East Indies during that time has increased the popularity of Indonesian-style nasi goreng to the world.

After the independence of Indonesia, nasi goreng was popularly considered as a national dish, albeit unofficial. Its simplicity and versatility has contributed to its popularity and made it as a staple among Indonesian households—colloquially considered as the most "democratic" dish since the absence of an exact and rigid recipe has allowed people to do anything they want with it. Nasi goreng that is commonly consumed daily in Indonesian households were considered as the quintessential dish that represents an Indonesian family. It is in the menu, introduced, offered, and served in Indonesian Theater Restaurant within the Indonesian pavilion at the 1964 New York World's Fair. Howard Palfrey Jones, the US ambassador to Indonesia during the last years of Sukarno's reign in the mid-1960s, in his memoir "Indonesia: The Possible Dream", said that he liked nasi goreng. He described his fondness for nasi goreng cooked by Hartini, one of Sukarno's wives, and praised it as the most delicious nasi goreng he ever tasted.

In 2018, nasi goreng was officially recognized by the Indonesian government as one of the country's national dishes along with four others: soto, sate, rendang, and gado-gado.

Preparation 

Nasi goreng is distinguished from other Asian fried rice recipes by its aromatic, earthy and smoky flavour. Nasi goreng is traditionally served at home for breakfast and it is traditionally made out of leftover rice from the night before. The texture of leftover cooked rice is considered more suitable for nasi goreng than that of freshly cooked rice which may be too moist and soft to withstand frying in a wok.

Other than cooked rice, nasi goreng consists of at least three components; ingredients (e.g. egg, shrimp, meat, cooking oil), bumbu spice or seasoning (e.g. garlic, shallot, salt, chili pepper), and condiments (e.g. bawang goreng, krupuk, acar pickles, slices of fresh cucumber and tomato). The combination of spices and ingredients in different ratio creates myriad variation of flavours.

Spice and seasonings 

Typical seasonings for nasi goreng include but are not limited to salt, chilli pepper, spring onions, turmeric, palm sugar, bumbu paste made from ground garlic and onion or shallot, kecap manis (sweet soy sauce), shrimp paste,  black pepper, fish sauce, powdered broth and so on. Eggs may be scrambled into the rice during the cooking process, or served as accompaniments in the form of sunny side up eggs, omelettes, and boiled eggs. Scraps of leftovers from a prepared dish, perhaps chicken or beef pieces, may also be used.

Condiments 
Nasi goreng often adds condiments or garnishes as add-ons. Fried shallot and traditional crackers are often sprinkled upon to give crispy texture, slices of cucumber and tomato for garnishing and to give freshness in an otherwise oily dish, a fried egg is often placed on top of the dish to add savouriness, while chili paste is to add the zesty spiciness according to one's preference. Some common condiments are:
Bawang goreng: fried shallot, sprinkled upon nasi goreng
Kerupuk: various types of crackers, usually emping or prawn crackers
Acar: pickles made from vinegar preserved cucumber, shallots, carrot, and small chilli pepper
Telur: egg; could be cooked in many ways and placed on the nasi goreng, usually fried or omelette
Sambal: chilli sauce

Variations 
There is no single defined recipe for nasi goreng, as every fried rice dish with certain mixtures, additions, ingredients, and toppings could lead to another recipe of nasi goreng. There is an innumerable variety of fried rice recipes described as nasi goreng in the nations of Brunei, Indonesia, Malaysia, and Singapore. While many versions are perceived as regionally specific, some recipes share common elements that transcends regional and national boundaries: examples include the use of the term kampung ("village" in Indonesian and Malay), shrimp paste (terasi in Indonesian, belacan in Malay), chilli-based sambal relishes, salted fish, and the technique of wrapping fried rice in an omelette.

Indonesia 

According to Dwi Larasatie, an Indonesian culinary expert from the Gadjah Mada University, there are 104 types of nasi goreng found throughout Indonesia. All of them are different because they have special spices that characterise the region. Of that 104 nasi goreng variants are classified into three groups; nasi goreng whose origins can be clearly known (36 types), then some developed nasi goreng because it cannot be traced to the area of ​​origin (59 types), and there are 9 types of nasi goreng whose basic ingredients are not only rice, but also contains additional mixture such as noodles, barley, corn, etc.

In most parts of Indonesia, nasi goreng is cooked with ample amounts of kecap manis (sweet soy sauce) that creates a golden brownish colour, and the flavour is mildly sweet. A typical preparation of nasi goreng may involve stir frying rice in a small amount of cooking oil or margarine; seasoned with an ample amount of kecap manis and ground shrimp paste, and cooked with other ingredients, particularly eggs and chicken. However, in other places such as Eastern Indonesia (Sulawesi and Maluku), the sweet soy sauce is usually absent and is replaced by bottled tomato and chili sauce, creating reddish-coloured nasi goreng. This variant is called nasi goreng merah (red fried rice) or nasi goreng Makassar after the South Sulawesi capital. Some variants of nasi goreng, such as salted fish or teri Medan (Medan's anchovy) nasi goreng, do not use kecap manis at all, creating a lighter colour similar to Chinese fried rice or Japanese chahan.

The basic ingredients of nasi goreng are rice and sliced or ground bumbu (spices) mixture of shallot, garlic, pepper, salt, tomato ketchup, sambal or chili sauce, and usually sweet soy sauce. Some variants may add saus tiram (oyster sauce), ang-ciu (Chinese cooking red wine), kecap ikan (fish sauce), or kecap inggris (like Worcestershire sauce). Typically in Indonesian households, the ingredients of nasi goreng prepared for daily breakfast consist of leftovers of the previous day's meals preserved in the refrigerator, with fresh vegetables and eggs added.

Many variants are named after their main ingredients, others after their city or region of origin. Specific examples of nasi goreng include:
Nasi goreng ayam (with chicken)
Nasi goreng kambing (with goat meat), particularly renowned in the Kebon Sirih area in Central Jakarta.
Nasi goreng domba (with mutton)
Nasi goreng sapi (with beef)
Nasi goreng babi (with pork, usually served with Chinese pork belly and charsiu)
Nasi goreng babat gongso (with tripe), a tripe fried rice from Semarang
Nasi goreng dendeng lemak (with fatty dendeng thin beef jerky) also known as nasi goreng tiarbah
Nasi goreng usus (with intestine)
Nasi goreng ati ampela (with chicken liver and gizzard)
Nasi goreng pete/petai (with green stinky bean)
Nasi goreng jengkol (with jengkol stinky pea)
Nasi goreng kacang polong (with green peas)
Nasi goreng telur (with egg)
Nasi goreng telur asin (with salted duck egg)
Nasi goreng terasi (with terasi shrimp paste) 
Nasi goreng petis (with petis udang), a type of thick black shrimp paste with molasses like consistency
Nasi goreng petir (lit: "thunderbolt fried rice"), an extra hot and spicy fried rice
Nasi goreng udang (with shrimp)
Nasi goreng cakalang (with skipjack tuna), speciality of Manado
Nasi goreng roa (with halfbeak fish), also speciality of Manado
Nasi goreng tuna (with tuna)
Nasi goreng cumi (with squid)
Nasi goreng seafood (with seafood, such as squid, fish and shrimp)
Nasi goreng ikan asin (with salted fish)
Nasi goreng teri Medan (with Medan's anchovy)
Nasi goreng ebi (with salted dried shrimp)
Nasi goreng jamur (with mushroom)
Nasi goreng sosis (with beef or chicken sausages)
Nasi goreng kornet (with corned beef and margarine)
Nasi goreng daging asap (with smoked beef)
Nasi goreng siram (fried rice poured with chicken and vegetables soup/sauce)
Nasi goreng tomat (tomato fried rice)
Nasi goreng bayam (spinach fried rice)
Nasi goreng lada hitam (black pepper fried rice) 
Nasi goreng saus tiram (oyster sauce fried rice)
Nasi goreng saus teriyaki (teriyaki sauce fried rice) usually beef or chicken fried rice in teriyaki sauce, a Japanese influence in Indonesia
Nasi goreng keju (with cheese, either mozzarella or cheddar)
Nasi goreng rendang (rendang fried rice), rich and spicy fried rice usually made from leftover rendang spices
Nasi goreng spesial (special fried rice) with complete ingredients, including chicken, egg mixed in rice, sausages, vegetables, and topped with sunny side up fried egg
Nasi goreng Jawa (Javanese fried rice)
Nasi goreng Sunda (Sundanese fried rice), spicy fried rice with ample of kunyit (turmeric) which add golden yellow colour
Nasi goreng Bali (Balinese fried rice), rich in spices including chopped lemongrass, turmeric, shallot, garlic and galangal, and uses no soy sauce.
Nasi goreng Aceh (Acehnese fried rice), rich in spices akin to mie aceh
Nasi goreng Padang (Padang fried rice), also rich in spices similar to Aceh fried rice
Nasi goreng Surabaya (Surabaya fried rice) contains chicken, shrimp, bakso, egg and vegetables
Nasi goreng Magelangan (Magelang fried rice) or also called as Nasi goreng Mawut (scrambled or mixed up fried rice), a combo of fried rice and noodle with vegetables and spices
Nasi goreng krengsengan (with meat and fresh cabbage), spicy fried rice with chopped noodles and meat, similar to nasi goreng Magelangan
Nasi goreng rempah, spicy fried rice with ample of bumbu spice mixture
Nasi goreng petis (with petis), a thick black paste made of shrimp paste or fish paste, specialty of East Java
Nasi goreng sambal terasi (Sambal shrimp paste fried rice), or simply nasi goreng terasi (terasi shrimp paste fried rice)
Nasi goreng sambal ijo/hijau (green sambal fried rice), often simply called nasi goreng hijau (green fried rice)
Nasi goreng pedas, hot and spicy fried rice with chili peppers
Nasi goreng rawit, extra hot and spicy fried rice with cabe rawit or bird's eye chili
Nasi goreng jancuk, extra hot and spicy fried rice from Surabaya
Nasi goreng setan (devil's fried rice), extra hot and spicy fried rice with various types of chili peppers, including sambal paste, sliced fresh bird's-eye chili and chili powder
Nasi goreng merah or nasi goreng Makassar (red fried rice)
Nasi goreng hitam (black fried rice), or nasi goreng cumi hitam, coloured and flavoured with squid ink
Nasi goreng pelangi (rainbow fried rice), without soy sauce with colourful vegetables
Nasi goreng amplop (egg-enveloped fried rice), known as nasi goreng pattaya in Malaysia.
Nasi goreng santri (vegetarian fried rice)
Nasi goreng nanas (pineapple fried rice), also known as nasi goreng Hawaii or nasi goreng Thailand
Nasi goreng gila (crazy fried rice), fried rice topped with more savoury additional ingredients including chicken, meat, shrimp, sliced bakso, sausages, egg, etc.

Indonesians also called foreign versions of fried rice simply as nasi goreng, thus nasi goreng Hongkong and nasi goreng Tionghoa/China refer to Chinese fried rice, while nasi goreng Jepang refer to yakimeshi or chahan.

Malaysia 

Nasi goreng is a commonly popular household dish in Malaysia. It is also can be found in restaurants and food courts in the country.

Nasi goreng variants popular in Malaysia includes:
Nasi goreng ayam (fried rice usually served with crispy fried chicken with sweet chilli sauce)
Nasi goreng belacan (fried with leftover sambal belacan and fish or other meats)
Nasi goreng blackpepper (fried rice with chicken or beef in blackpepper sauce)
Nasi goreng cendawan (fried rice cooked with mushrooms)
Nasi goreng cili api/masak pedas (spicy fried rice served with chicken/beef)
Nasi goreng dabai (a Sarawak speciality which the rice is fried with a seasonal native fruit called 'buah dabai').
Nasi goreng daging/kambing (fried rice with beef or mutton)
Nasi goreng ikan masin (fried with salted fish)
Nasi goreng kampung (fried with anchovies/leftover fried fish, kangkong)
Nasi goreng kerabu (fried rice with local salads)
Nasi goreng kunyit (fried rice served with turmeric and meat with onions, long beans and carrots)
Nasi goreng kari (fried rice cooked with curry)
Nasi goreng ladna (fried rice cooked with seafood and vegetables in white gravy)
Nasi goreng masak merah (fried rice with chicken or beef in chilli gravy)
Nasi goreng mamak (Indian Muslim style nasi goreng)
Nasi goreng nenas (fried rice cooked with pineapples)
Nasi goreng paprik (fried rice served with paprik dish, usually chicken)
Nasi goreng pattaya (fried rice in an omelette envelope which is topped with chili sauce or tomato sauce, sometimes includes chicken)
Nasi goreng petai (fried rice cooked with parkia speciosa)
Nasi goreng seafood (fried with prawn, calamari slices and crab sticks)
Nasi goreng sotong (fried rice cooked with calamary)
Nasi goreng telur (fried rice served with fried eggs)
Nasi goreng tomyam (fried rice cooked in tomyum paste)
Nasi goreng udang (fried rice cooked with prawn)
Nasi goreng USA (fried rice with three luxury ingredients namely prawn (udang), squid (sotong) and chicken (ayam))
Nasi goreng Amerika (with fried egg and stirred fried beef in chili sauce)

Singapore 

In Singapore, nasi goreng is one of the most popular rice dishes with many variations including sausage, stinky beans, seafood, beef and chicken. Some of the variants include:
Nasi goreng Singapore or Singapore-style fried rice (A unique combination of Chinese seasonings and Indian spices are used to flavour this simple fried rice dish made with shrimp, mushrooms, cabbage and carrots)
Nasi goreng ayam or Chicken fried rice (fried rice with chicken)
Nasi goreng telur Singapore or Singapore egg fried rice (simply fried with egg)
Nasi goreng seafood (fried with mixed of squid, crab and shrimp)
Nasi goreng pedas or Spicy Fried Rice (spicy fried rice)
Nasi goreng sayur or Singapore vegetable fried rice (fried with vegetables)
Nasi goreng sambal or Sambal fried rice (Malay fried rice with sambal or chili paste)
Nasi goreng lapis or Layered fried rice (fried rice layered with lot of veggies, noodles and adorned with chicken on the top layer)
Nasi goreng daging Mongolia or Mongolian Beef Fried Rice (fried rice mixed together with Mongolian beef style)
Nasi goreng daging or Beef fried rice (fried with beef)
Nasi goreng kari or Curry flavoured fried rice (fried rice flavoured with curry powder)
Nasi goreng ayam ham or Chicken ham fried rice (fried with chicken ham)

Singapore has an ethnic Chinese majority that has influenced local cuisine. Chinese fried rice recipes, such as Yeung Chow fried rice also popular throughout in Singapore.

Brunei 

Nasi goreng is a common rice dish in Brunei. Nasi goreng ikan masin or fried rice with salted fish is the most popular version.

Nasi goreng variants commonly popular in Brunei includes:
Nasi goreng pulau Brunei (floating fried rice)
Nasi goreng belutak (fried rice with belutak, the traditional Bruneian beef sausage)
Nasi goreng corned beef (fried with corned beef)
Nasi goreng ikan masin (fried with salted fish)
Nasi goreng kampung Brunei (fried with shrimp paste)
Nasi goreng sardin (fried with sardine)
Nasi goreng keropok belinjau (fried rice served with keropok belinjau)
Nasi goreng seafood (fried with mixed of squid, crab and shrimp)

Sri Lanka 

Nasi goreng is adopted into Sri Lankan cuisine through cultural influences from the Sri Lankan Malays. It is prepared using a variety of ingredients including spices, soy sauce, oyster sauce, ginger, white onion, shrimp, cucumber and prawns.

Netherlands 

In the Netherlands, Indonesian cuisine is common due to the historical colonial ties with Indonesia. Indo-Dutch and Indonesians cater Indonesian food both in restaurants and as take-away. Also, take-away versions of nasi goreng are plentiful in toko Asian grocery shop and supermarkets. Supermarkets also commonly carry several brands of spice mix for nasi goreng, along with krupuk and other Indonesian cooking supplies. Chinese take-aways and restaurants have also adapted nasi goreng, plus a selection of other Indonesian dishes, but spice them Cantonese style. In Flanders, the name nasi goreng is often used for any Asian style of fried rice. Distinctive version of nasi goreng has been developed, such as Javanese-Suriname version of the dish. In the Netherlands, nasi goreng has been developed into a snack called nasischijf (Dutch for "nasi disk"), it is a Dutch deep-fried fast food, consisting of nasi goreng inside a crust of breadcrumbs.

A typical type of nasi goreng, created in the Dutch Indies by Indo-Dutch or Dutch and still eaten in The Netherlands today is made with butter and bacon or other types of pork at its base.

Availability 

Nasi goreng can be eaten at any time of day, and many Indonesians, Malaysians and Singaporeans eat nasi goreng for breakfast whether at home or at dining establishments. As a main meal, nasi goreng may be accompanied by additional items such as a fried egg, ayam goreng (fried chicken), satay, vegetables, seafood dishes such as fried shrimp or fish, and kerupuk crackers.

Street food 
Nasi goreng is a popular staple served by street vendors, in warungs and also by travelling night hawkers that frequent residential neighbourhoods with their wheeled carts. When accompanied by a fried egg, it is sometimes called nasi goreng istimewa (special fried rice). Nasi goreng is usually cooked to order for each serving, since the cook usually asks the client their preference on the degree of spiciness: mild, medium, hot or extra hot. The spiciness corresponds to the amount of sambal or chili pepper paste used. The cook might also ask how the client would like their egg done: mixed into nasi goreng or fried separately as telur mata sapi or ceplok (fried whole egg) or as telur dadar (omelette). Nevertheless, some popular nasi goreng warung or food stalls may prepare in bulk due to large demand.

In many warungs (street stalls) in Indonesia, nasi goreng is often sold together with bakmi goreng (fried noodles), kwetiau goreng, and mie rebus (noodle soup).

Restaurant 

Nasi goreng is a popular dish in restaurants. In Indonesia there are restaurant chains that specialise at serving nasi goreng.

Convenience store 
Some seasoning brands sold in Indonesian supermarkets offer "bumbu nasi goreng", an instant nasi goreng seasoning paste to be applied upon frying leftover rice. Convenience store outlets in Indonesia also offering prepackage frozen microwave-heated nasi goreng take away.

In popular culture 
Tante Lien's song "Geef Mij Maar Nasi Goreng" (Just Give Me Nasi Goreng), composed and recorded in 1979, illustrates historical culinary ties between the Netherlands and Indonesia, as well as whimsically describing the craving of people of Indo (Eurasian) descent repatriated in the Netherlands for Indonesian cuisine.
In February 1973 Philip Proctor and Peter Bergman from The Firesign Theatre released their first solo album TV or Not TV on which a character named "Nasi Goreng" sings a song of the same name to introduce himself.
In 2011, an online poll with participation from 35,000 voters held by CNN International chose Indonesian-style nasi goreng as number two on their 'World's 50 Most Delicious Foods' list after rendang. 
The titular police division in the 2016 Japanese comedy series  is named after the dish.
During their 2016 concert in Indonesia, the Australian band 5 Seconds of Summer dedicated a song inspired by the dish entitled "Nasi Goreng".

Gallery

See also 

 Fried rice
 List of fried rice dishes
Sinangág
 Cuisine of Brunei
 Cuisine of Indonesia
 Cuisine of Malaysia
 Cuisine of Singapore
 Cuisine of the Netherlands
 Biryani

References

External links 

Fried rice
Indonesian rice dishes
Bruneian cuisine
Malay cuisine
Malaysian rice dishes
National dishes
Singaporean cuisine
Street food in Indonesia
Thai cuisine
Surinamese cuisine